Gaoming District, formerly romanized as Koming, is an urban district of Foshan, Guangdong, in the People's Republic of China. Gaoming is located west of downtown Foshan and had a population of 420,044 during the 2010 census.

History
Under the Qing, Gaoming County was administered as part of the commandery of Zhaoqing.

Administration divisions
Gaoming District is located within Foshan. Neighboring cities, districts, and counties are Gaoyao to the North, Xinxing County to the West, Heshan to the South, Nanhai District and Sanshui District to the East. The district is divided into one subdistrict and three towns.

Economy
Gaoming has resources of Gold, Copper, Tungsten and other minerals. Gaoming county is an important producer of foodstuffs within Guangdong, as well as food and textiles.

McDonald's and KFC both feature along Wenchang Lu alongside other Western clothes retail outlets and Watson's pharmacy stores. Otherwise, Western shops are rare. Nonetheless, shopping facilities cater well for day-to-day needs. The primary shopping streets are Canjiang Lu, Wenchang Lu and Wenhau Lu. Markets are also numerous and can be found simply by turning off the primary streets into nearby side-roads.

Transport
Gaoming is not particularly well integrated into transport systems. The railway from Guangzhou to Maoming as well as the  Guangzhou-Foshan-Kaiping highway do not reach this area of the county. Gaoming has a river port on the Xi River.

Gaoming has a sizeable bus station located on Hexiang Lu. It provides transport to a number of locations including Guangzhou, Foshan, Kaiping and Zhuhai in mainland China, and Hong Kong. Buses to Guangzhou terminate at Fangcun Bus Station (adjoined to Ximenkou Metro) and the Central Bus Station (adjoined to Guangzhou Train Station). Both buses take just over an hour and cost around Y33.

Buses to Foshan (Chancheng) cost either 8 or 10 yuan, depending on whether you take the slower or faster bus.

The future Pearl River Delta International Airport is currently being built in Genghe town, which will replace the Foshan Shadi Airport in Nanhai District.

Activities
Affordable food can be easily found along Wenhua Lu in the City Centre, but if you turn off the main road you often find better, cheaper restaurants (in Xinghe Lu for instance).
Gaoming is famous for its Lai Fen, a local food only found here. It is a type of rice noodle.
There are three big Western restaurants: The Harbour Restaurant, Ming Xiang and Oupo.

Gaoming has plenty of entertainment for its size.  There are two cinemas, an old one on Canjiang Lu and another one within the newly opened Walmart. There are also several places where you can play pool or snooker, gyms, and some bars, the most popular being New Face (on Hexiang Lu) and Honey (on Cangjiang Lu). One of the most popular places to go in Gaoming is the Century Square, a large flat open space by the river. Many people gather here in the evening to go dancing (many different styles), go rollerskating, play with kites, or simply to have a walk.

Notes

References

Citations

Bibliography
 , reprinted 2000.
 

County-level divisions of Guangdong
Foshan